Steffen Haage (born 16 August 1965) is a German diver. He competed in the men's 10 metre platform event at the 1988 Summer Olympics.

References

External links
 

1965 births
Living people
German male divers
Olympic divers of East Germany
Divers at the 1988 Summer Olympics
Sportspeople from Halle (Saale)
20th-century German people